Rodenrijs is a metro station, as a part of the Rotterdam metro and the regional light rail system RandstadRail, located in Rodenrijs, the Netherlands.

History
The railway station opened here on 1 October 1908 as part of the Hofpleinlijn. As the nearby station Berkel was closed in 1965, the name of the Rodenrijs station was changed into Berkel en Rodenrijs. This station was closed on 3 June 2006 for refurbishment work to a RandstadRail metro station.

The RandstadRail station opened on 10 September 2006 for the RET Erasmuslijn metro service, currently line E, now under the name of Rodenrijs again, as at the same time the new station Berkel Westpolder was opened. The station features 2 platforms, that are the same height as the train doors.

In 2006 and 2007 the service was operated as a shuttle Rotterdam Hofplein - Nootdorp. The station lies in the south west of Rodenrijs. As of 2008 the service was after Nootdorp extended to The Hague Central station. In 2010 the route on the Rotterdam side changed to Rotterdam Central and in 2011 to Rotterdam Slinge.

Train services
The following services currently call at Rodenrijs:

Bus services
These services depart from near the station, on the Oostlaan:

 172 (Rodenrijs Town Service (Anticlockwise) - Rodenrijs RR - Berkel en Rodenrijs - Bergschenhoek - Rodenrijs RR) (operated by Qbuzz)
 174 (Rodenrijs Town Service (Clockwise) - Rodenrijs RR - Bergschenhoek - Berkel en Rodenrijs - Rodenrijs RR) (operated by Qbuzz)

Railway stations opened in 1908
RandstadRail stations
1908 establishments in the Netherlands
Railway stations in the Netherlands opened in the 20th century